Joshua Lincoln Oppenheimer (born September 23, 1974) is an American-British film director based in Copenhagen, Denmark. He is known for his Oscar-nominated films The Act of Killing (2012) and The Look of Silence (2014), Oppenheimer was a 2014 recipient of the MacArthur fellowship and a 1997 Marshall Scholar.

Life and career 
Oppenheimer was born to a Jewish family, in Austin, Texas, and grew up in and around Washington, D.C., and Santa Fe, New Mexico. Oppenheimer received a Bachelor of Arts (BA) summa cum laude in film-making from Harvard University and a PhD from Central Saint Martins College of Art and Design, University of the Arts London, while studying on a Marshall Scholarship. He is Professor of Film at the University of Westminster.

His first film The Entire History of the Louisiana Purchase (1997) won a Gold Hugo from the Chicago International Film Festival (1998).

From 2004 to 2012, he produced a series of films in Indonesia. His debut feature film about the individuals who participated in the Indonesian mass killings of 1965–66, The Act of Killing (2012), premiered at the 2012 Telluride Film Festival. It went on to win many prizes worldwide, including the European Film Award for Best Documentary, a Panorama Audience Award, and a Prize of the Ecumenical Jury from the 63rd Berlin International Film Festival. The film also received the Robert Award by the Film Academy of Denmark, a Bodil Award by Denmark's National Association of Film Critics, and the Aung San Suu Kyi Award at the Human Rights Human Dignity International Film Festival 2013

Oppenheimer appeared on The Daily Show on August 13, 2013, to talk about The Act of Killing.

The Act of Killing won the BAFTA for Best Documentary, European Film Award for Best Documentary, the Asia Pacific Screen Award for Best Documentary, and was nominated for Best Documentary Feature at the 86th Academy Awards.

Oppenheimer's next film, The Look of Silence (2014), is a companion piece to The Act of Killing. It was nominated for Best Documentary Feature at the 88th Academy Awards. It was screened in competition at the 71st Venice International Film Festival and won the Grand Jury Prize, the International Film Critics Award (FIPRESCI), the Italian online critics award (Mouse d'Oro), the European Film Critics Award (F.E.D.E.O.R.A.) for the Best Film of Venezia 71, as well as the Human Rights Nights Award. Since then, it has gone on to win a further 70 international awards, including an Independent Spirit Award, an IDA Award for Best Documentary, a Gotham Award for Best Documentary, and three Cinema Eye Honors, including Best Film and Best Director. Cinema Eye Honors named him a decade-defining filmmaker in 2016, and both his films as decade-defining films.

In a 2015, interview with The New York Times, Oppenheimer stated that the West shares "a great deal" of responsibility for the mass killings in Indonesia, noting in particular that "the United States provided the special radio system so the Army could coordinate the killings over the vast archipelago. A man named Bob Martens, who worked at the United States Embassy in Jakarta, was compiling lists of thousands of names of Indonesian public figures who might be opposed to the new regime and handed these lists over to the Indonesian government." In 2014, after a screening of The Act of Killing for US Congress members, Oppenheimer called on the US to acknowledge its role in the killings. In October 2017, the U.S. government declassified thousands of files related to the killings, with officials citing the impact of Oppenheimer's films.

In July 2016, he was named as a member of the main competition jury for the 73rd Venice International Film Festival. In September 2017 he was the guest director for the Telluride Film Festival.

In 2021, film production company Neon announced Oppenheimer will direct a feature-film musical starring Tilda Swinton, Stephen Graham and George MacKay.

Personal life
Oppenheimer is openly gay and lives with his partner Shu in Copenhagen, Denmark.

Filmography

Books 
Acting on AIDS: Sex, Drugs & Politics (Acting on AIDS). London & New York: Serpent's Tail, 1997, . (With Helena Reckitt, co-editor.)
Going through the motions and becoming other. (With Michael Uwemedimo, co-author). In: Chanan, Michael, (ed.) Visible evidence. Wallflower Press, 2007. London, UK. (In Press)
History and Histrionics: Vision Machine's Digital Poetics. (With Michael Uwemedimo, co-author). In: Marchessault, Janine, and Lord, Susan, (eds.) Fluid screens, expanded cinema. University of Toronto Press, 2007, Toronto, Canada, pp. 167–183. .
Show of force: a cinema-séance of power and violence in Sumatra's plantation belt. (With Michael Uwemedimo, co-author). In Critical Quarterly, Volume 51, No 1, April 2009, pp. 84–110. Edited by: Colin MacCabe. Blackwell Publishing, 2009. ISSN 0011-1562.
Killer Images: Documentary Film, Memory and the Performance of Violence. (With Joram Ten Brink, co-author). Columbia University Press (Feb 28, 2013),

References

External links

Joshua Oppenheimer on the making and the meaning of The Look of Silence – interview on the 7th Avenue Project Radio Show
Joshua Oppenheimer on The Act of Killing – interview on the 7th Avenue Project Radio Show
University of Westminster profile
Suharto's Purge, Indonesia's Silence. Joshua Oppenheimer for The New York Times. September 29, 2015.

Living people
1974 births
Harvard College alumni
Alumni of Central Saint Martins
MacArthur Fellows
Marshall Scholars
People from Austin, Texas
Film directors from Copenhagen
Artists from Santa Fe, New Mexico
People from Washington, D.C.
Film directors from Texas
20th-century American Jews
LGBT Jews
LGBT film directors
European Film Awards winners (people)
American expatriates in Denmark
LGBT people from Texas
Film directors from Washington, D.C.
Film directors from New Mexico
Bodil Special Award recipients
21st-century American Jews
Postmodernist filmmakers